Lynn Davis Deas (June 16, 1952 – May 10, 2020) was a professional American bridge player. At the time of her death, she was second in the World Bridge Federation (WBF) All time Women Ranking by Placement Points, which do not decay over time.

Deas was a native of Newport News, Virginia, near Norfolk, where she was a student at Eastern Virginia Medical School when she suffered a bad automobile accident in 1980. Already an avid bridge player, she played "all the time" when broken bones and blurry vision forced her to take one-year leave from school, and subsequently decided to drop out in favor of the card game as a career.

Deas won 27 North American Bridge Championships (NABC) titles and nine world championships, including three in the Venice Cup. At one time Deas ranked first among Women World Grand Masters. At one time she was on the road as a professional player for 30 weeks a year. She was diagnosed with muscular dystrophy in 1997 and reduced her travel. In January 2012, she was living in Schenectady, New York.

At the inaugural SportAccord World Mind Games in Beijing, December 2011, Deas and Beth Palmer won the "Pairs Women" gold medal. Not a world championship meet, the SportAccord WMG invited 24 women from Great Britain, France, China, and the U.S. to compete in three small tournaments as four national teams, twelve pairs, and 24 individuals. The six U.S. women also won the Teams gold medal. Beside the two gold medals Deas won $8,000 in cash prizes.

Bridge accomplishments

Awards
 ACBL Hall of Fame, 2020
 Sidney H Lazard Jr. Sportsmanship Award, 2004
 IBPA Sportsman of the Year, 1997
 Fishbein Trophy (1) 1994

Wins
 World Women's Team Championships (7) and World Women's Pairs (2) 
 North American Bridge Championships (24)
 Smith Life Master Women's Pairs (4) 1983, 1985, 1994, 2008 
 Machlin Women's Swiss Teams (5) 1987, 1995, 1996, 2007, 2012 
 Wagar Women's Knockout Teams (7) 1999, 2002, 2003, 2005, 2008, 2010, 2013 
 Sternberg Women's Board-a-Match Teams (5) 1992, 1995, 2005, 2006, 2008 
 Chicago Mixed Board-a-Match (3) 1982, 2004, 2006

Runners-up

 North American Bridge Championships
 von Zedtwitz Life Master Pairs (1) 2002 
 Rockwell Mixed Pairs (1) 2005 
 Smith Life Master Women's Pairs (2) 1989, 2010 
 Freeman Mixed Board-a-Match (1) 2014 
 Machlin Women's Swiss Teams (2) 2008, 2013 
 Wagar Women's Knockout Teams (4) 1981, 1986, 1992, 1994 
 Sternberg Women's Board-a-Match Teams (2) 1991, 2001 
 Chicago Mixed Board-a-Match (2) 1981, 1984

References

External links
 
 
 Women Stars at the World Bridge Federation – with biographies (Deas)
 DEAS Lynn athlete information at the 2011 SportAccord World Mind Games

1953 births
2020 deaths
American contract bridge players
People from Newport News, Virginia
People from Schenectady, New York
People with muscular dystrophy
Venice Cup players